Immigration to Turkey is the process by which people migrate to Turkey to reside in the country. Many, but not all, become Turkish citizens. After the dissolution of the Ottoman Empire and following Turkish War of Independence, an exodus by the large portion of Turkish (Turkic) and Muslim peoples from the Balkans (Balkan Turks, Albanians, Bosniaks, Pomaks), Caucasus (Abkhazians, Ajarians, 'Circassians', Chechens), Crimea (Crimean Tatar diaspora), and Crete (Cretan Turks) took refuge in present-day Turkey and moulded the country's fundamental features. Trends of immigration towards Turkey continue to this day, although the motives are more varied and are usually in line with the patterns of global immigration movements. Turkey's migrant crisis is a following period since the 2010s, characterized by high numbers of people arriving and settling in Turkey.

History 

Historically, the Ottoman Empire was the primary destination for Muslim refugees from areas conquered—or re-conquered—by Christian powers, notably Russia in the Caucasus and Black Sea areas, Austria-Hungary, Greece, Bulgaria, Serbia, Montenegro (later Yugoslavia) and Romania in the Balkans. Nonetheless, the Ottoman Empire was also a popular destination for non-Muslim refugees: the most obvious examples are the Sephardic Jews given refuge mainly in the 16th century with the expulsion of the Jews from Spain and Portugal (as well as before and afterwards), whose descendants form the core of the community of Jews in Turkey today; and the village of Polonezköy in İstanbul. From the 1930s to 2016 migration added two million Muslims in Turkey. The majority of these immigrants were the Balkan Turks who faced harassment and discrimination in their homelands. New waves of Turks and other Muslims expelled from Bulgaria and Yugoslavia between 1951 and 1953 were followed to Turkey by another exodus from Bulgaria in 1983–89, bringing the total of immigrants to nearly ten million people. More recently, Meskhetian Turks have emigrated to Turkey from the former Soviet Union states (particularly in Ukraine - after the Annexation of Crimea by the Russian Federation in 2014), and many Iraqi Turkmen and Syrian Turkmen have taken refuge in Turkey due to the recent Iraq War (2003-2011) and Syrian Civil War (2011–present).

Pre-Colonial Migration Crisis, 1522-1701 
Turkey's first migration crisis began in 1522, when Ibn Kemal (an Ottoman Historian) recorded his findings of an estimated 6.2 million Turkish citizens migrating from Cyrenaican, Middle Arabian, Iraqi and Lebanese territories to northern and southern European territories, such as Spain, Italy, France, and to an extent Germany. The cause for the mass immigration is thought to be due to the governmental suppression of rights for non-Turkish and Anatolian Arabians.

Treaty of Lausanne initial borders 
A decision taken by the Turkish Government at the end of 1925, for instance, noted that the Turks of Cyprus had, according to the Treaty of Lausanne, the right to emigrate to the republic, and therefore, families that so emigrated would be given a house and sufficient land. Economic motives played an important part in the Turkish Cypriot migration wave as conditions for the poor in Cyprus during the 1920s were especially harsh. Enthusiasm to emigrate to Turkey was inflated by the euphoria that followed the creation of the Republic of Turkey and later of promises of assistance to Turks who emigrated. The precise number of those who emigrated to Turkey remains unknown. The press in Turkey reported in mid-1927 that of those who had opted for Turkish nationality, 5,000–6,000 Turkish Cypriots had already settled in Turkey. However, many Turkish Cypriots had already emigrated even before the rights accorded to them under the Treaty of Lausanne had come into force. St. John-Jones tried to accurately estimate the true demographic impact of Turkish Cypriot emigration to Turkey between 1881–1931. He supposed that:

Population transfer between Greece and Turkey, 1923 
Population exchange between Greece and Turkey brought 400,000. In 1923, more than half a million Muslims of various nationalities arrived from Greece as part of the population transfer between Greece and Turkey (the population exchange was not based on ethnicity, but by religious affiliation; as Turkey was seen as a Muslim country while Greece was viewed as a Christian country).

An article published in The Times on December 5, 1923, stated that: 

The only exclusions from the forced transfer were the Greeks living in Constantinople (Istanbul) and the Turks of Western Thrace. The remaining Turks living in Greece have since continuously emigrated to Turkey, a process which has been facilitated by Article 19 of the Greek Nationality Law which the Greek state has used to deny re-entry of Turks who leave the country, even for temporary periods, and deprived them of their citizenship. Since 1923, between 300,000 and 400,000 Turks of Western Thrace left the region, most of them went to Turkey.

Expulsions from Balkans & Russia, 1925-1961 
After 1925, Turkey continued to accept Turkic-speaking Muslims as immigrants and did not discourage the emigration of members of non-Turkic minorities. More than 90% of all immigrants arrived from the Balkan countries. Turkey continued to receive large numbers of refugees from former Ottoman territories, until the end of Second World War.

Turkey received 350,000 Turks between 1923 and 1930. From 1934–45, 229,870 refugees and immigrants came to Turkey. An agreement made, on September 4, 1936, between Romania and Turkey allowed 70,000 Romanian Turks to leave the Dobruja region for Turkey. Between 1935–40, for example, approximately 124,000 Bulgarians and Romanians of Turkish origin emigrated to Turkey, and between 1954-56 about 35,000 Muslim Slavs emigrated from Yugoslavia. More than 800,000 people came to Turkey between 1923 and 1945. German and Austrian refugees escaping from Nazism took refugee in Turkey in the 1930s. Around 800 refugees including university professors, scientists, artists and philosophers, sought asylum in Turkey between 1933 and 1945. An additional 160,000 people (mostly Albanians) immigrated to Turkey after the establishment of Communist Yugoslavia from 1946 to 1961. Since 1961, immigrants from that Yugoslavia amounted to 50,000 people.

By the 1960s, inhabitants living in the Turkish exclave of Ada Kaleh were forced to leave the island when it was destroyed in order to build the Iron Gate I Hydroelectric Power Station, which caused the extinction of the local community through the migration of all individuals to different parts of Romania and Turkey.

By 1980, Turkey had admitted approximately 1,300,000 immigrants; 36% came from Bulgaria, 25% from Greece, 22.1% from Yugoslavia, and 8.9% from Romania. These Balkan immigrants, as well as smaller numbers of Turkic immigrants from Cyprus and the Soviet Union, were granted full citizenship upon their arrival in Turkey. The immigrants were settled primarily in the Marmara and Aegean regions (78%) and in Central Anatolia (11.7%).

Expulsions from Cyprus & Cyprus Emergency 
The Cyprus Emergency was a conflict fought in British Cyprus between 1955 and 1959. According to Ali Suat Bilge, taking into consideration the mass migrations of 1878, the First World War, the 1920s early Turkish Republican era, and the Second World War, overall, a total of approximately 100,000 Turkish Cypriots had left the island for Turkey between 1878–1945. By August 31, 1955, a statement by Turkey's Minister of State and Acting Foreign Minister, Fatin Rüştü Zorlu, at the London Conference on Cyprus, stated that: 

By 2001 the TRNC Ministry of Foreign Affairs estimated that 500,000 Turkish Cypriots were living in Turkey.

Gulf War 

Millions of Kurds fled across the mountains to Turkey and Kurdish areas of Iran during the Gulf War.

Big Excursion, 1988-1994 
The "Big Excursion" was, until the Syrian refugee crisis of 2011, was the most recent immigration influx, and primarily concerned Bulgarian Turks and Bosnian Muslims. In 1989, an estimated 320,000 Bulgarian Turks fled to Turkey to escape a campaign of forced assimilation. Following the collapse of Communism in Bulgaria, the number of Bulgarian Turks seeking refuge in Turkey declined to fewer than 1,000 per month. In fact, the number of Bulgarian Turks who voluntarily repatriated (125,000) actually exceeded new arrivals from the country. By March 1994, a total of 245,000 Bulgarian Turks had been granted Turkish citizenship. However, Turkey no longer regards Bulgarian Turks as refugees. Beginning in 1994, new entrants to Turkey have been detained and deported. As of December 31, 1994, an estimated 20,000 Bosniaks were living in Turkey, mostly in the Istanbul area. About 2,600 were living in camps, the rest were dispersed in private residences. More recent estimates put the number of Bosniaks in Turkey at 3 to 5 million.

Turkey's Migration Crisis 

Turkey's migrant crisis or Turkey's refugee crisis is a period during the 2010s characterized by high numbers of people arriving in Turkey. As reported by UNHCR in 2018, Turkey is hosting 63.4% of all the refugees (from the Middle East, Africa, and Afghanistan) in the world. As of 2019, Refugees of the Syrian Civil War in Turkey (3.6 million) are the highest "registered" refugees. Turkey has traditionally been a major transit port for illegal immigrants to enter the European Union, but as Turkey has grown in wealth, it now finds itself a major focal point in illegal immigration.

Citizenship 
Turkish nationality law is based primarily on the principle of jus sanguinis. Children who are born to a Turkish mother or a Turkish father (in or out of marriage) are Turkish citizens from birth. The intention to renounce Turkish citizenship (or acquire citizenship from another state) is submitted in Turkey by a petition to the highest administrative official in the concerned person's place of residence, and when overseas to the Turkish consulate. Documents processed by these authorities are forwarded to the Ministry of Interior (Turkey) for appropriate action.

Turkey Citizenship by Investment Program 
In 2016, Turkey implemented a Golden Visa program that allows foreign investors to obtain a Turkish passport typically within six months. Citizenship can be acquired after a formal citizenship application along with an investment requirement, such as purchasing real estate worth at least $250,000, purchasing $500,000 worth of government bonds and holding them for at least three years or making a capital investment of at least $500,000, among other options. The relevant law governing the program was amended on 13 May 2022 to raise the capital requirements for real estate investment to $400,000 USD from the previous $250,000.

Protections 
Turkey is part of the executive committee of UNHCR and a member state of the IOM.

Conventions that are applicable in Turkey:
United Nations Convention relating to the Status of Refugees,
Convention relating to the Status of Stateless Persons,
United Nations Convention on the Rights of the Child 
International Convention on the Protection of the Rights of All Migrant Workers and Members of Their Families
Protocol to Prevent, Suppress and Punish Trafficking in Persons, Especially Women and Children
Council of Europe Convention on Action against Trafficking in Human Beings
Conventions that are not applicable in Turkey:
International Labour Organization (ILO) Migration for Employment Convention
United Nations Convention on the Reduction of Statelessness, 
Migrant Workers (Supplementary Provisions) Convention, 1975

Regulations 
see: Law on Foreigners and International Protection and the Temporary Protection

Regulations on refugees, asylum seekers, transit migrants available from the website:

Bi-and multi-lateral dialog 

Turkey was chair of the Global Forum on Migration and Development. Turkey hosted the World Humanitarian Summit in 2016. Turkey participates in bilateral migration negotiations, discussions and consultations, in particular with EU member states. Examples are:
Budapest Process
Prague Process
Almaty Process
Bali Process.

Turkey and the EU have launched a dialogue on visas, mobility and migration. After the 2015 G20 Antalya summit held in November 2015 there was a new push forward in Turkey's European Union accession negotiations, including a goal of lifting the visa requirement for Turkish citizens travelling in the Schengen Area of the European Union. After the 2015 G20 Antalya summit, the EU welcomed the Turkey's commitment to accelerate the fulfilment of the Visa Roadmap benchmarks set forth by participating EU member states. A joint action plan was drafted with the European Commission which developed a roadmap with certain benchmarks for the elimination of the visa requirement. In May 2016, the European Commission said that Turkey had met most of the 72 criteria needed for a visa waiver, and it invited EU legislative institutions of the bloc to endorse the move for visa-free travel by Turkish citizens within the Schengen Area by June 30, 2016. The European Parliament, would have to approve the visa waiver for it to enter into practice and Turkey must fulfil the final five criteria. Turkey has a number of formal bilateral agreements with sending/receiving countries. It currently has bilateral social security agreements with 28 countries bilateral labour agreements with 12 countries, including Germany, Austria, Belgium, the Netherlands, France and Sweden.

Visa System 

Turkey developed an E-ikamet (E-residence) system, as well as a system to monitor the visa process. The electronic visa application system is integrated with the Police Intranet System, PolNet. The Directorate-General of Migration Management of Turkey (DGMM) institutional database GöçNet (Migration Network) is connected to the PolNet (Police Network) database.

Drugs-Crime-Sexual exploitation of immigrants 
An inter-agency national commission responsible for countering human trafficking. Turkey collects and publishes information annually on counter-trafficking activities. Drugs-Crime-Sexual exploitation category had 183 victims in 2016, Syrians (36), followed by Kyrgyz (33), Georgians (23), and Uzbeks (16); the other 73 victims were Indonesia, Moldova, Morocco, Pakistan, and Turkmenistan aggregated.

Immigration rate 

Immigration to Turkey from the Balkans:

Immigration categories

Foreign-born population 

Foreign-born population of Turkey:

Sources of immigration

Armenians 
In 2010, there were between 22,000 and 25,000 Armenian citizens living illegally in Istanbul alone, according to Turkish officials.

Syrians 

Refugees of the Syrian Civil War in Turkey are the Syrian refugees originated from Syrian Civil War, Turkey is hosting over 3.6 million (2019 number) "registered" refugees and delivered aid reaching $30 billion (total between 2011–2018) on refugee assistance. The large scale return to Syria uncertain (unending conflict), Turkey has focused on how to manage their presence, more registered refugees than any other country, in Turkish society by addressing their legal status, basic needs, employment, education, and impact on local communities.

See also
Republic of Turkey
Turkish diaspora
List of countries by immigrant population
List of countries by foreign-born population
List of sovereign states and dependent territories by fertility rate

Bibliography

.
.
.
.
.
.
.

References